25th Chunsa Film Art Awards
19 June 2020

The Chunsa Film Art Awards (also known as the Icheon Chunsa Film Festival) have been presented in South Korea since the founding of the prize by the Korea Film Directors' Society in 1990.

Winners and nominees 
The nominees for the 25th Chunsa Film Art Awards were announced on 9 March 2020.

Films with multiple wins
The following films received multiple wins:

Films with multiple nominations 

The following films received multiple nominations:

See also 

56th Grand Bell Awards
56th Baeksang Arts Awards
40th Blue Dragon Film Awards
28th Buil Film Awards

References

External links
 

2020 film awards
South Korean film awards
Annual events in South Korea
2020 in South Korean cinema
Events in Seoul